Neihu  is a township-level division situated in Lufeng, Shanwei, Guangdong, China.

See also
List of township-level divisions of Guangdong

References

Township-level divisions of Guangdong